Acumen may refer to:

 Acumen (organization) (formerly known as Acumen Fund), a non-profit global venture fund
 Acumen (magazine), a triannual British poetry magazine
 Acumen Nation, an American rock music group originally known as Acumen
 Acumen Publishing, a British publisher

See also
 Business acumen